Weld may refer to:
 Welding, a metalworking technique
 Weld (name), and persons with the name
 Weld, Maine, United States
 Weld County, Colorado, United States
 Weld (album), 1991, by  Neil Young & Crazy Horse
 Reseda luteola, a plant, and intense yellow dye made from it

See also
 WELD (disambiguation)
 Wield
 Wild (disambiguation)